Rudolf Wegscheider (18 October 1859 – 8 January 1935) was an Austrian chemist of Banat Swabian origin.
Wegscheider studied chemistry and was the founder of the Austrian School of Chemistry. He taught at the University of Vienna, and from 1902 to 1931 he was departmental Chair. He was the chairman of the association of Austrian chemists from 1904 to 1929. 
R. Wegscheider introduced the principle of detailed balance for chemical kinetics.

Awards
Lieben Prize, 1905
Wilhelm Exner Medal, 1923

References

Austrian chemists
People from Zrenjanin
1859 births
1935 deaths
Academic staff of the University of Vienna